The Bourne Initiative is the fourteenth novel in the Bourne series and eleventh by Eric Van Lustbader. The book was released on June 13, 2017, as a sequel to The Bourne Enigma.

Plot summary

Reception
Publishers Weekly commented: "No one is what they seem, and the endless deceptions reliably lead to the extravagant action scenes that are Lustbader’s hallmark. Series fans will eagerly await Bourne’s next adventure."

References

2017 American novels
American spy novels
American thriller novels
Bourne (novel series)
Novels by Eric Van Lustbader
Grand Central Publishing books